The Gašinci military training grounds is a Croatian Army training base located 10 kilometers from Đakovo, in the region of Slavonia, Croatia. The complex is a part of the Croatian Army Training and Doctrine Command.

History 
Prior to being used by the Croatian Army, the Gašinci military training grounds was built and used by the Yugoslav Peoples Army (JNA). Captured by Croatian forces in the early days of the Croatian War of Independence, from 1991-95 Gašinci served as the Croatian Army's primary live-fire training centre. 

In 2013, a 21-year-old soldier Marko Zalović was killed when he was run over by a M-84 main battle tank that unexpectedly veered from its route and killed the young soldier who was in a trench by the road.

Geography and layout 
The Gašinci military training grounds covers 3 263.60 hectares and is divided into two parts. The eastern portion is dedicated to administrative command buildings, training facilities and sports fields; while the western area, which covers 2,100 hectares, is a dedicated training area. 

Smaller than the Eugen Kvaternik military training ground near Slunj, the Gašinci complex covers an area of 7.5 x 5 kilometers and is best suited for training individuals and smaller groups at the company and battalion level. The complex is capable of providing logistical support for exercises and hosting a variety of training events for the firing of weapons, including: small arms, anti-tank rockets, artillery and armoured vehicles

References 

Military of Croatia
Military installations of Croatia
Osijek-Baranja County